The following is a list of products, services, and apps provided by Yandex. Active, soon-to-be discontinued, and discontinued products, services, tools, hardware, and other applications are broken out into designated sections.

List

Discontinued products and services

See also 

 Yandex

References

External links 

 {Official website}
{Yandex|state=collapsed}
Yandex
[[Category:Products by individual]
[[Category:Lists of products]